Junior Hunter Finals is a two-day national championship held by the United States Equestrian Federation at two different coasts of the United States (East Coast and West Coast) in the summer of every year. It is held for qualifying Junior Hunter riders who show at either the 3'3" or 3'6" height.

Competition
The USEF Junior Hunter Finals was established in 2001 as a way to showcase talent from across the country. In 2014, the 3'3" section was added due to its growing popularity throughout the states.

To show at Junior Hunter Finals, a rider must either be ranked among the top ten in their United States Equestrian Federation (USEF) Zone–which is accomplished by earning points through competition–or win either a Reserve Champion or Champion title in their respective Junior Hunter division at a USEF rated "AA" "A" "B" or "C" show. Around 700+ horses qualified in 2016 to show at either coast's finals.

Although a rider may qualify for either the 3'3" or 3'6" division, they must pick one to show in during finals if they choose to attend. A rider also must choose between the East Coast and the West Coast finals as they cannot compete in both.

The competition itself consists of three phases (similar to USEF Pony Finals): under saddle, classic round, and handy round. The under saddle is a typical hunter flat class that counts for 20% of the overall score. The classic round is a typical hunter course and the handy hunter is reminiscent of trappy sections of hunt country; each count for 40% of the overall score. Each section is awarded ribbons to tenth place, as well as the overall top ten. An overall championship is awarded for both the 3'3" and 3'6" sections.

The USHJA Gladstone Cup Equitation Classic (formerly the Hunterdon Cup) also takes place during Junior Hunter Finals. Riders qualify by being an active USHJA member and winning at least one USEF Medal, ASPCA Maclay, WIHS Equitation Overall, or USEF Show Jumping Talent Search class. The class consists of three rounds, starting with a classic hunter round that each participant completes and is given a score following the round. The top twenty riders from the classic round complete a second handy hunter round. Scores are combined for the two rounds and 4-10 riders are called back at the judges discretion for final testing. Riders switch horses and are allowed a short warm up before completing a shortened test.

Recent Champions

References

External links
 Complete List of Champions from 2001-2015

Equestrian sports competitions in the United States